Alexander Galindo  (born May 26, 1985) is a Puerto Rican professional basketball player who plays with Indios de Mayagüez of the Baloncesto Superior Nacional.  He also is a member of the Puerto Rico National Basketball Team.

References

1985 births
Living people
Cangrejeros de Santurce basketball players
FIU Panthers men's basketball players
Kansas Jayhawks men's basketball players
People from Mayagüez, Puerto Rico
Puerto Rican men's basketball players
Small forwards
2014 FIBA Basketball World Cup players